Until 1 January 2007 Give municipality was a municipality (Danish, kommune) in Vejle County on the Jutland peninsula in southeast Denmark.  The municipality covered an area of 403 km2, and had a total population of 14,090 (2005).  Its last mayor was Villy Dahl Johansen. The main town and the site of its municipal council was the town of Give.

Give municipality ceased to exist as the result of Kommunalreformen ("The Municipality Reform" of 2007).  It was merged with Børkop, Egtved, Jelling, and Vejle municipalities to form a new Vejle Municipality, and a part went to Billund Municipality, namely a part of Billund Airport located on properties in the parishes Lindeballe and Ringive.  Vejle Municipality belongs to Region of Southern Denmark.

External links

References 
 Municipal statistics: NetBorger Kommunefakta, delivered from KMD aka Kommunedata (Municipal Data)
 Municipal mergers and neighbors: Eniro new municipalities map

Former municipalities of Denmark